Torn Between Dimensions is the debut album by At War With Self.  It was Glenn Snelwar's first album after he appeared on the first Gordian Knot album.

Track listing
 "The God Interface" (4:04)
 "Torn Between Dimensions" (5:57)
 "A Gap In the Stream of Mind - Part I" (4:11)
 "Grasping At Nothing" (5:22)
 "Coming Home" (5:30)
 "The Event Horizon" (5:18)
 "A Gap In the Stream of Mind - Part II" (7:45)
 "Run" (3:04)
 "A Gap in the Stream of Mind - Part III" (1:37)
 "At War With Self" (7:17)

Personnel

Band members 

Glenn Snelwar - electric and acoustic guitars, mandolins, keyboards, e-bow, string arrangements, programming

Guest musicians 

Michael Manring - fretless bass and e-bow
Mark Zonder - drums, percussion

References
@ Glenn Snelwar's official website

2005 debut albums
At War with Self albums